The following Confederate States Army units and commanders fought in the Battle of Wilson's Creek of the American Civil War, fought on August 10, 1861 near Springfield, Missouri.  Though identified with the Confederates, the Missouri State Guard were technically an independent army, as Missouri had not yet seceded, and were not folded into the Confederate Army of the West until March 17, 1862. Though identified with the Confederates, the Arkansas State Troops were technically not yet Confederate troops. Arkansas had seceded on May 6, 1861 and been recognized as a Confederate States, but Brigadier General Nichols Pearce's troops had not been transferred from the State of Arkansas to the Confederate Government and had not been sworn into Confederate Service. After the battle, Pearce's troops voted to disband rather than enter Confederate Service.

The Union order of battle is shown separately.

Abbreviations used

Military rank
 BG = Brigadier General
 Col = Colonel
 Ltc = Lieutenant Colonel
 Maj = Major
 Cpt = Captain

Other
 k = killed
 w = wounded

Confederate Forces at Wilson’s Creek
BG Benjamin McCulloch

Western Army
BG Benjamin McCulloch

Missouri State Guard
MG Sterling Price (w)

Notes

References
NPS Order of Battle
 Brooksher, William Riley. Bloody Hill: The Civil War Battle of Wilson’s Creek (Washington: Brassey's, Inc.), 2000. 
 Piston, William Garrett & Richard W. Hatcher, III. Wilson's Creek: The Second Battle of the Civil War and the Men Who Fought It (Chapel Hill, NC:  The University of North Carolina Press), 2003.

See also

 Missouri in the American Civil War
 List of Arkansas Civil War Confederate units
 Arkansas Militia in the Civil War

American Civil War orders of battle
Arkansas in the American Civil War
Military units and formations in Arkansas
Missouri in the American Civil War